Hale Mills is a hamlet in the parish of Chacewater, Cornwall, England.

References

Hamlets in Cornwall